Marina Alexeevna Eltsova (born 4 February 1970) is a Russian former pair skater. She represented the Soviet Union until its fall, and, after that, Russia. With partner Andrei Bushkov, she is the 1996 World champion and a two-time (1993 and 1997) European champion.

Eltsova and Bushkov missed the 1997–1998 Champions Series Final because Bushkov had a groin injury. They withdrew from the 1998 European Championships – Bushkov's right blade broke during the short program. The pair competed at the 1998 Winter Olympics, where they placed seventh. They were coached by Natalia Pavlova in Saint Petersburg.

Eltsova previously skated with Sergei Zaitsev, representing the Soviet Union.

Competitive highlights
GP: Champions Series / Grand Prix

With Bushkov

With Zaitsev

References

External links
 Pairs on Ice: Marina Eltsova & Andrei Bushkov
 

1970 births
Living people
Russian female pair skaters
Soviet female pair skaters
Figure skaters at the 1998 Winter Olympics
Olympic figure skaters of Russia
Figure skaters from Saint Petersburg
World Figure Skating Championships medalists
European Figure Skating Championships medalists
Universiade medalists in figure skating
Goodwill Games medalists in figure skating
Universiade gold medalists for the Soviet Union
Universiade bronze medalists for the Soviet Union
Competitors at the 1989 Winter Universiade
Competitors at the 1991 Winter Universiade
Competitors at the 1994 Goodwill Games